Polskie Nagrania "Muza" ("Polish Records 'Muse' ", official name since 2005: "Polskie Nagrania Sp. z o.o", i.e., Polskie Nagrania Ltd.) is a Polish record label based in Warsaw. It has produced records in many genres including pop, rock, jazz, folklore, classical, children. Until its purchase by Warner Music Poland in 2015, for €1.9 million, the label was owned by the Polish government.

The label was established in 1956 after the merger of the vinyl record factory Muza and the record house Polskie Nagrania (with the history of the latter traced to the Interbellum times). It also produced musical literature. In addition to its own vinyl record factory, it also used the factories of Pronit and Veriton.

Roster

 ABBA (single release "Honey Honey"/"My Mama Said" (1974)
 Anna German
 Bajm
 Budka Suflera
 Czerwone Gitary
 Czerwono-Czarni (disbanded)
 Deuter
 Dżem
 Grzegorz Markowski
 Homo Homini
 Kombi (disbanded)
 Marek Grechuta
 Maryla Rodowicz
 Niebiesko-Czarni
 Stanisław Sojka
 SBB
 Seweryn Krajewski
 Stan Borys
 Tadeusz Nalepa
 Czesław Niemen (aka, Czesław Wydrzycki)
 Urszula Kasprzak
 Wojciech Skowroński

References

Polish record labels
Warner Music Group
State-owned record labels